The land of Vietnamese is an anti-war song, circulated in the Western world in the years of the Vietnam War.

This song has appeared once in the movie "The Death Coordinates" directed by Samvel Gasparov veteran – as the singer Kate Francis sings with the guitar.

References 
 Tatyana Lebedeva with "The death Coordinates"

External links 
 Anti-war Songs a website collecting thousands of antiwar songs from all over the world
 Folk&More: Songbook & Tabs a growing collection of chords, tabs, and lyrics of anti-war songs from Bob Dylan to Bob Marley

Songs of the Vietnam War
Anti-war songs
Songs about Vietnam